The first sugar mill in India was established in the year 1903 in Pratappur area of Deoria district.
Sugar has been produced in India since ancient times and then it spread to other parts of the world. Sugarcane is a native of tropical Indian subcontinent and Southeast Asia. In India, sugarcane is planted thrice a year in October, March and July depending on part of the country.  Most of the sugar production in India takes at local Cooperative Sugar mills. After gaining Independence, India made serious plans for overall industrial development of sugar industry.

Market 

Sugar industry is a big business in India. Around 525 mills produced more than 30 million tonnes of sugar in the last crushing season, which lasted from October to April. This makes it the world's largest producer, unseating Brazil. Some 50 million farmers and millions of more workers, are involved in sugarcane farming. India is the world's largest consumer of sugar. According to data from the Indian Sugar Mills Association, the country's sugar mill produce 268.21lakh tonnes of sugar between October 1, 2019 and May 31, 2020.

On May 24, 2022, the Indian government announced that India will restrict the export of sugar from June 1, 2022. This restriction has been ordered to maintain domestic availability and ensure price stability.

Production of Sugar cane in India 
Sugar cane is very important input for making sugar . When production of sugar cane increases, sugar production also increases. Sugar cane's production increased from 110 million tonnes in year 1961 to 405 million tonnes in year 2019. Sugar cane are grown in 2413 thousand hectare in 1961 year to 5061 thousand hectare in year 2019. Production quality for sugar cane is also increased. Production quantity improved from 45 tonnes/hectare to 80 tonnes/hectare.

Production of sugar cane by state 
Traditionally, Uttar Pradesh and Maharashtra produce the majority of sugar cane in India. This can be attributed to rich soil surrounding major rivers present in both states. However in 2019 Maharashtra was hit with floods thus affecting total production.

Products and by-products 
The processing of sugarcane generates bagasse, molasses and press mud. Indian sugar industry has been using these by-products to generate bioethanol, electricity and many other products over the years.

Organisations 

 Indian Sugar Mills Association (ISMA)
All India Sugar Trade Association (AISTA)
 National Sugar Institute (NSI)
 The Sugar Technologists Association of India (STAI)

See also 

 Cooperative sugar factories in Maharashtra
 Indian Institute of Sugarcane Research
 History of sugar

References 

India
Industries in India